Ibn al-Jawzi may refer to:

Abu'l-Faraj ibn al-Jawzi (1116–1201), Arab historian and Hanbali jurist
Sibt ibn al-Jawzi (died 1256), Arab scholar and Hanafi jurist, grandson of Abu-al-Faraj ibn al-Jawzi
Ibn Qayyim al-Jawziyya (1292–1350), Arab scholar